Open Your Eyes may refer to:

Film
 Open Your Eyes (1919 film), an American melodrama directed by Gilbert P. Hamilton
 Open Your Eyes (1997 film) (Abre los ojos), a Spanish film by Alejandro Amenábar
 Open Your Eyes (2008 film), an American short film by Susan Cohen
 Open Your Eyes, a 2012 short film starring Lia Marie Johnson

Television 

 Open Your Eyes (TV series), Polish television series from 2021
 "Open Your Eyes" (The Walking Dead), an episode of The Walking Dead
 Open Your Eyes, a morning television program on Great Belize Television

Music
 Open Your Eyes (band), an American rock band

Albums
 Open Your Eyes (Goldfinger album), or the title song, 2002
 Open Your Eyes (Warzone album), or the title song, 1989
 Open Your Eyes (Yes album), or the title song (see below), 1997
 Open Your Eyes, by David Hasselhoff, 2019
 Open Your Eyes, by The Faragher Brothers, 1979
 Open Your Eyes, by Kim Kyung Ho, 2003
 Open Your Eyes, by Maria Muldaur, 1979
 Open Your Eyes, by Rapture Ruckus, 2011
 Open Your Eyes, by Victoria Beckham, 2003
 Open Your Eyes, a mixtape by Macklemore, 2000

Songs
 "Open Your Eyes" (Alter Bridge song), 2004
 "Open Your Eyes" (Guano Apes song), 1997
 "Open Your Eyes" (The Lords of the New Church song), 1982
 "Open Your Eyes" (Snow Patrol song), 2007
 "Open Your Eyes" (Yes song), 1997
 "Open Your Eyes", by 12 Stones from 12 Stones
 "Open Your Eyes", by AFI from Answer That and Stay Fashionable
 "Open Your Eyes", by Asia from Alpha
 "Open Your Eyes", by Basshunter from Calling Time
 "Open Your Eyes", by Bea Miller
 "Open Your Eyes", by Black Box from Dreamland
 "Open Your Eyes", by Bobby Caldwell from Cat in the Hat
 "Open Your Eyes", by Disturbed from Immortalized
 "Open Your Eyes", by Eyeopener
 "Open Your Eyes", by Iz*One from Bloom*Iz
 "Open Your Eyes", by John Legend from Love in the Future
 "Open Your Eyes", by Julian Lennon from Mr. Jordan
 "Open Your Eyes", by Loudness from The Birthday Eve
 "Open Your Eyes", by Nalin & Kane
 "Open Your Eyes", by Staind from Break the Cycle
 "Open Your Eyes", by Steve Angello and Alex Metric from the soundtrack of the video game FIFA 12
 "Open Your Eyes", by Stream of Passion from Embrace the Storm
 "Open Your Eyes", by Sum 41 from Chuck
 "Open Your Eyes", by United State of Electronica from U.S.E.

Other uses
 Open Your Eyes (magazine), an American magazine for Latinos

See also
 Eyelid
 Close Your Eyes (disambiguation)